Manikeshwari Temple is located in Kalahandi district of Odisha, India. The temple is located to the south of Bhawanipatna. The main deity here is Goddess Manikeshwari. She is the Ishta Devi of Nagavanshi Khyatriya's.
During Dussehra festival, animal sacrifice is offered at this temple. A film is also documented showing the ritual of animal sacrifice, before Goddess Manikeshwari. Karlapat, which is famous for its charming wild life, is near the temple.

History of Present Temple 
Udit Narayan Deo laid the foundation of the present Manikeswari temple in Bhawanipatna and it was completed in 1947 by Brajamohan Deo. Manikeswari was associated with Kalahandi history as a goddess of wealth, Manik, since the 10th century.

Chhatar Yatra
Every year Chatar yatra on the navami tithi of Dussehra is organised and many people who have fulfilled wishes come and sacrifice animals in the name of goddess.

Images

Manikeswari Temples in Odisha

Panoramic Views

References

External links
 

Shakti temples
Hindu temples in Kalahandi district